Pau Pyrénées Airport  is an airport serving Pau, France.

Airlines and destinations
The following airlines operate regular scheduled and charter flights at Pau Pyrénées Airport:

Statistics

Military usage
Apart from the civilian terminal, there are military installations on the south side of the airfield. These host the 4th Special Forces Helicopter Regiment, the 5th Combat Helicopter Regiment and the French Army's paratrooper's training.

Aircraft production
In 2015 Airbus announced that its E-Fan electric aircraft was to be produced at Pau Pyrénées Airport, at a new facility to be constructed in 2016. The location was chosen to be near the DAHER-SOCATA plant at Tarbes. First deliveries of the E-Fan were expected at the end of 2017 or early 2018.

Accidents and incidents
On 25 January 2007, Air France Flight 7775 from Pau to Paris crashed shortly after take-off. All 54 passengers and crew escaped from the Fokker 100 although one person was killed on the ground. An investigation by the BEA revealed that the cause of the accident was ice on the wings of the aircraft involved.

References

External links
Pau Pyrénées Airport 
Aéroport Pau Pyrénées 
Aéroport de Pau – Pyrénées (Union des Aéroports Français) 

Airports in Nouvelle-Aquitaine
Buildings and structures in Pau